"Space Oddity" is a song by English singer-songwriter David Bowie. It was first released on 11 July 1969 by Philips Records as a 7-inch single, then as the opening track of his second studio album David Bowie. Produced by Gus Dudgeon and recorded at Trident Studios in London, it is a tale about a fictional astronaut named Major Tom; its title and subject matter were partly inspired by 2001: A Space Odyssey (1968) and Bowie's feelings of alienation at that point in his career. One of the most musically complex songs he had written up to that point, it represented a change from the music hall-influenced sound of his debut to a sound akin to psychedelic folk and inspired by the Bee Gees.

Rush-released as a single to capitalise on the Apollo 11 Moon landing, it received critical praise and was used by the BBC as background music during its coverage of the event. It initially sold poorly but soon reached number five in the UK, becoming Bowie's first and only chart hit for another three years. A 1972 reissue by RCA Records was Bowie's first US hit and was promoted with a new music video filmed by Mick Rock. Another 1975 reissue as part of a maxi-single became Bowie's first UK number-one single. Bowie re-recorded an acoustic version in 1979. A mainstay during Bowie's concerts, Bowie revisited the Major Tom character in his later singles, notably the sequel song "Ashes to Ashes" (1980).

A range of artists have covered "Space Oddity" and others have released songs that reference Major Tom. A 2013 cover by Canadian astronaut Chris Hadfield gained widespread attention; its music video was the first filmed in space. The song has appeared in numerous films and television series, and has a pivotal role in the 2013 film The Secret Life of Walter Mitty. In 2019, Visconti remixed Bowie's original recording to mark the 50th anniversary of its first release, with a new music video directed by Tim Pope. Initially viewed as a novelty track, "Space Oddity" is now considered one of Bowie's finest recordings and remains one of his most popular songs. It has appeared in numerous "best-of" lists, including the Rock and Roll Hall of Fame's "500 Songs that Shaped Rock and Roll".

Background and writing
After a string of unsuccessful singles, David Bowie released his music hall-influenced self-titled debut studio album through Deram Records in 1967. The album was a commercial failure and did little to gain Bowie notice, becoming his last release for two years. Around this time, Bowie acquired a new manager, Kenneth Pitt. In 1968, Bowie began a romantic relationship with dancer Hermione Farthingale, which lasted until February 1969. With Farthingale and guitarist John Hutchinson, Bowie formed a group called Feathers. With Bowie on acoustic guitar, the trio performed a small number of concerts between September 1968 and early 1969, combining folk, Merseybeat, poetry and mime. After the commercial failure of David Bowie, Pitt authorised the production of a promotional film in an attempt to introduce Bowie to a larger audience. The film, Love You till Tuesday, which marked the end of Pitt's mentorship of Bowie, went unreleased until 1984.

By the end of 1968, Bowie had begun to feel alienation from his career. Knowing Love You till Tuesday did not have a guaranteed audience and would not feature any new material, Pitt asked Bowie to write something new; "a very special piece of material that would dramatically demonstrate David's remarkable inventiveness and would probably be the high spot of the production". With this in mind, Bowie wrote "Space Oddity", a tale about a fictional astronaut named Major Tom, the first of Bowie's famous characters. Its title and subject matter were influenced by Stanley Kubrick's 2001: A Space Odyssey, which premiered in May 1968. Bowie said, "I went stoned out of my mind to see the movie and it really freaked me out, especially the trip passage". Biographer Marc Spitz stated the song was likely inspired by the scene in which an astronaut communicates with his daughter on her birthday, saying "Tell mama that I telephoned" before ingesting a "stress pill", rather than the film's opening or ending. Malcolm Thompson, who directed Love You till Tuesday, later said he and his girlfriend Susie Mercer contributed to the songwriting process. Bowie's break-up with Farthingale deeply affected Bowie. He later said, "It was Hermione who got me writing for and on a specific person". Spitz stated Bowie's feelings of loneliness and heartache following the break-up inspired "Space Oddity".

One of the first people to hear "Space Oddity" was Calvin Mark Lee, the head of A&R at Mercury Records in London, who considered the song "otherworldly" and knew it was Bowie's ticket to be signed by the label. According to Mercury associate Simon Hayes, "Lee was really on the case with 'Space Oddity', a total convert. He wanted to sign David – and I said 'Fantastic idea'." At the time, Bowie's future wife Angela Barnett, whom he met in late 1968, was dating Lou Reizner, the head of Mercury, who was unimpressed with Bowie's output. Eager to sign Bowie, Lee, without Reizner's knowledge, financed a demo session for "Space Oddity". Lee later told Spitz: "We had to do it all behind Lou's back. But it was such a good record."

Composition

Lyrics
"Space Oddity" tells the story of an astronaut named Major Tom, who is informed by Ground Control that a malfunction has occurred in his spacecraft but Major Tom does not get the message because he either misses it or is in such awe of outer space he does not hear it. He remains in space "sitting in a tin can, far above the world", preparing for his lonely death. In 1969, Bowie compared Major Tom's fate to the ending of 2001: A Space Odyssey, saying: "At the end of the song Major Tom is completely emotionless and expresses no view at all about where he's at. He's fragmenting ... at the end of the song his mind is completely blown – he's everything then." Authors David Buckley and Peter Doggett comment on the unusual vocabulary in the lyrics, such as "Ground Control" rather than "Mission Control", "space ship" rather than "rocket", "engines on" rather than "ignition", and the "unmilitary combination" of rank and first name for the character.

Bowie's biographers have provided different interpretations of the lyrics. According to Doggett, the lyrics authentically reflect Bowie's mind and thoughts at the time. He writes that Bowie shone a light on the way advertisers and the media seek to own a stake in a lonely man in space while he himself is exiled from Earth. Chris O'Leary said the song is a "moonshot-year prophecy" that humans are not fit for space evolution and the sky is the limit. Similarly, James Perone views Major Tom acting as a "literal character" and a "metaphor" for individuals who are unaware of, or do not make an effort to learn, what the world is. In 2004, American feminist critic Camille Paglia identified the lyrics as representing the counterculture of the 1960s, stating, "As his psychedelic astronaut, Major Tom, floats helplessly into outer space, we sense that the '60s counterculture has transmuted into a hopelessness about political reform ('Planet earth is blue / And there's nothing I can do')".

Music
"Space Oddity" has been characterised as a psychedelic folk ballad. It represented Bowie's new interest in acoustic music since joining Feathers. Pegg and Doggett compare the song's style, structure, lyrics and arrangement to those of the Bee Gees' 1967 single "New York Mining Disaster 1941", which has similar minor chords and chorus. Hutchinson later stated: "'Space Oddity' was a Bee Gees type song. David knew it, and he said so at the time ... the way he sang it, it's a Bee Gees thing."

"Space Oddity" is one of the most complex songs Bowie had written up to that point. He storyboarded each section, all leading into the next until completion. According to O'Leary, in a little over five minutes, the song includes "a faded-in intro, a 12-bar solo verse, a 'liftoff' sequence, a duet verse, a bridge, a two-bar acoustic guitar break, a six-bar guitar solo, a third verse, another bridge, break and solo, and a 'Day in the Life'-style outro to the fade". Bowie stated in 2002 he was "keen on ... writing in such a way that it would lead me into leading some kind of rock musical". 

Although primarily in the key of C major, the song has a variety of chord changes and resonances that aid in telling the story. The intro has a pairing of F major7/E and E minor, while the first verse alternates between C major and E minor. Wayne's guitar harmonises E and B while on Stylophone, Bowie "drones" C and B. A D major chord plays on the line "God's love be with you" during the pre-liftoff countdown sequence. In the second verse, an E7 chord on the line "really made the grade" counteracts the overall key of C major. O'Leary said this change "brightens" the song. The bridge's "planet earth is blue" has a standard folk-style descending progression; (B major 9th/A minor add9/G major add9/F). According to O'Leary, the B major9 chord "ratifies Major Tom's choice (or doom) to stay out in space". The acoustic-guitar break has a C–F–G–A–A note sequence with the two A notes emphasised.

Recording

Early demos and first studio version
One of the early demos of "Space Oddity", recorded in January 1969, differs greatly from the album version, including unused vocal harmonies and different lyrics. Rather than the softly spoken "lift-off", an American-accented "blast-off!" is present. "I'm floating in a most peculiar way" is replaced with "Can I please get back inside now, if I may?". The demo also includes the later-revised lines:

And I think my spaceship knows what I must do
And I think my life on Earth is nearly through
Ground Control to Major Tom,
you're off your course, direction's wrong.

The demo's instrumentation uses only acoustic guitar and Stylophone, which were played by Hutchinson and Bowie, respectively. Bowie had used the Stylophone, a recently released electronic instrument that was mainly marketed to children, to compose the song's melody. Both Bowie and Hutchinson sang vocals on the recording; they recorded another demo version in approximately mid-April 1969.

The first full studio version of "Space Oddity", which was for Love You till Tuesday, was recorded on 2 February 1969 at Morgan Studios, London. At this point, the lyrics were finalised. The session was produced by Jonathan Weston; Bowie and Hutchinson were joined by Colin Wood on Hammond organ, Mellotron and flute; Dave Clague on bass and Tat Meager on drums. As in the early demos, Bowie and Hutchinson shared lead vocals, with Bowie voicing Major Tom's dialogue and Hutchinson singing Ground Control's lines. Bowie also played an ocarina solo for this recording, which Hutchinson later called "just silly". According to Pegg, this version is significantly inferior to the David Bowie recording.

Album version

In June 1969, after Bowie left Deram, Pitt negotiated a one-album deal, with options for a further one or two albums, with Mercury Records and its UK subsidiary Philips. Mercury executives had heard an audition tape that included the demo of "Space Oddity" Bowie and Hutchinson recorded in early 1969. The search for a producer began. After Beatles' producer George Martin turned down the project, Pitt hired Tony Visconti, who produced Bowie's later Deram sessions, to produce the album. Before recording for the album began, "Space Oddity" had been selected as the lead single. Visconti, however, saw it as a "novelty record"; in 2016, he told Yahoo! Music he found it derivative of works by the Beatles and Simon & Garfunkel, calling it "a cheap shot – a gimmick to cash in on the moonshot". Visconti produced the rest of the album but passed production responsibility for "Space Oddity" to Bowie's former engineer Gus Dudgeon. Dudgeon had worked as an engineer with Bowie on his Deram recordings. On hearing Bowie's demo, Dudgeon said it was "unbelievable"; he and Bowie then planned "every detail" of the recording.

Work on the album version of "Space Oddity" and its B-side "Wild Eyed Boy from Freecloud" began at Trident Studios in London on 20 June 1969. Bowie fell ill with conjunctivitis and overdubs were completed a few days later. Mercury insisted the single was released the following month, ahead of the Apollo 11 Moon landing. Guitarist Mick Wayne of the British band Junior's Eyes and keyboardist Rick Wakeman were brought on at Visconti's suggestion, while composer Paul Buckmaster was hired to arrange the orchestra, which consisted of eight violins, two violas, two cellos, two arco basses, two flutes and an organ. Buckmaster became an integral part in Bowie's songwriting; he advised Bowie to focus on creating the overall sound rather than the narrative. Dudgeon hired bassist Herbie Flowers and drummer Terry Cox of the folk band Pentangle, and Bowie on acoustic guitar and Stylophone completed the lineup. Bowie later said he added the Stylophone at Marc Bolan's suggestion; "[Bolan] said, you like this kind of stuff, do something with it. And I put it on 'Space Oddity', so it served me well."

Dudgeon outlined a plan for the Stylophone and Mellotron parts by scribbling notes on paper; he later told biographer Paul Trynka; "When we hit that studio we knew exactly what we wanted – no other sound would do." At one point in the session, Wayne thought he had finished his guitar take early so began retuning one of the strings. Dudgeon like the warped effect of the retuning and asked Wayne to repeat it on the next take. According to Trynka, towards the end of the session, the musicians knew they were a part of something special. Wakeman recorded his part in two takes after hearing the demo once; he later said; "it was one of half a dozen occasions where it made the hair stand up on your neck and you know you're involved in something special. 'Space Oddity' was the first time it ever happened to me". Cox also felt a sense of excitement after the session finished.

The session cost £500. Dudgeon was paid £100 for his work on the two songs; in June 2002, he instigated a lawsuit against Bowie claiming he did not receive the agreed two percent of royalties for "Space Oddity". Dudgeon intended to sue for a settlement of £1 million; the suit, however, was halted after Dudgeon's death in a car accident the following month. Dudgeon had told biographer David Buckley he felt "Space Oddity" was among the finest work of Bowie's career.

Mixing
"Space Oddity" was mixed in both mono and stereo formats, a rarity for radio singles at the time. Wakeman later said it was Bowie's idea to mix it in both formats, according to him: "To the best of my knowledge nobody released stereo singles at that time, and they pointed that out to David ... and I can remember David saying, 'That's why this one will be stereo!' And he just stood his ground ... he wasn't being awkward, but he had a vision of how things should be." Biographer Kevin Cann stated stereo copies were given to the media and radio stations while mono copies were given to retailers. According to Nicholas Pegg, the stereo single was sold only in specific territories, including Italy and the Netherlands; the mono single appeared in both Britain and America.

Release and promotion

Philips Records released "Space Oddity" as a  single on 11 July 1969 with the catalogue number Philips BF 1801 and "Wild Eyed Boy from Freecloud" as the B-side. Mercury handled its US release. Despite being a rarity for singles at the time, in some territories, the single's sleeve included a photograph of Bowie playing an acoustic guitar. The label rush-released the single to capitalise on the Apollo 11 Moon mission, which was launched five days later. According to Bowie: "It was picked up by British television and used as the background music for the landing itself in Britain ... Though I'm sure they really weren't listening to the lyric at all; it wasn't a pleasant thing to juxtapose against a moon landing. Of course, I was overjoyed that they did." Upon realising the dark lyrics, the BBC ceased playing it until the Apollo 11 crew safely returned home.

Shortly after its release, "Space Oddity" received some glowing reviews. Penny Valentine of Disc and Music Echo predicted the record was "going to knock back everyone senseless", and later named "Space Oddity" as the magazine's record of the year. In Melody Maker, Chris Welch wrote: "This Bee Geeian piece of music and poetry is beautifully written, sung and performed. Strangely, it could be a hit and escalate Bowie to the top." Despite the positive reviews and Pitt's attempts at chart rigging, the single initially failed to sell. In September 1969, the single debuted on the UK Singles Chart at number 48. Mercury's publicist Ron Oberman wrote a letter to American journalists describing "Space Oddity" as "one of the greatest recordings I've ever heard. If this already controversial single gets the airplay, it's going to be a huge hit." Despite this, the single failed to sell in the US, peaking at 124, which Pitt attributed to Oberman's use of the word "controversial" in his statement, causing it to be banned by multiple US radio stations.

The single's success in the UK earned Bowie a number of television appearances in the latter half of 1969, starting with a performance on Dutch television show Doebidoe on 25 August 1969 that was broadcast five days later. This was followed by his first appearance on the BBC's Top of the Pops on 2 October, for which Bowie was filmed in a separate studio so his image could be interspersed with NASA space footage. He played Stylophone and guitar over backing tracks prepared by Dudgeon, who was in charge of synchronising the BBC Orchestra to the backing track. According to Dudgeon in 1991, it was a "nightmare": they were given enough time for only two takes, the second of which had a tighter orchestra but sloppy cohesion between the space footage and Bowie. Dudgeon stated, "If we had had the chance of a third take it would have been brilliant". The performance was broadcast on 9 October and repeated on 16 October; it helped "Space Oddity" peak at number five by early November. The Top of the Pops performance was followed by performances on Germany's 4-3-2-1 Musik Für Junge Leute on 22 October (broadcast on 22 November) and on Switzerland's Hits A-Go-Go on 3 November. On 10 May 1970, Bowie performed "Space Oddity" at the Ivor Novello Awards, where he was awarded with Most Original Song.

Philips released David Bowie in the UK, with "Space Oddity" as the opening track on 14 November 1969. According to biographer Christopher Sandford, despite the commercial success of "Space Oddity", the remainder of the album bears little resemblance to it, resulting in its commercial failure on its initial release. Although Bowie was named 1969's Best Newcomer in a readers' poll for Music Now!, David Bowie sold just over 5,000 copies by March 1970. In mid-December 1969, Philips requested a new version of "Space Oddity" with Italian lyrics after learning that one had already been recorded in Italy. Pitt thought the idea was "ridiculous" and said, "it was explained to us that 'Space Oddity' could not be translated into Italian in a way that the Italians could understand". The Italian version was recorded on 20 December at Morgan Studios with accent coach and producer Claudio Fabi producing and lyrics being translated by Italian lyricist Mogol. This version, titled "Ragazzo solo, ragazza sola", was released as a single in Italy in 1970 and failed to chart.

When asked about the single's success, Visconti said: "[I was surprised] and years later [Bowie] and I joked about it so much. But the one thing I predicted was that he would not have a hit after that." Bowie did not have another hit after "Space Oddity" for three years until the release of "Starman". According to Pegg, in a year of novelty hits that began with the Scaffold's "Lily the Pink" and ended with Rolf Harris's "Two Little Boys", "Space Oddity" was destined for the same fate; nothing more than a novelty hit. He also noted by 1969, numerous space-themed songs, including Zager and Evans's "In the Year 2525", which was number one in the UK for the three weeks immediately before "Space Oddity"'s entry into the top 40, had already charted. Only later did it "transcend" the novelty hit to be regarded as a "genuine classic".

Rereleases

After the commercial breakthrough of Bowie's fifth studio album The Rise and Fall of Ziggy Stardust and the Spiders from Mars, RCA Records undertook a reissue campaign for his Mercury albums that included repackaging David Bowie with the title Space Oddity. To promote this release, in the US on 13 December 1972, RCA rereleased "Space Oddity" as a single backed by "The Man Who Sold the World" with the catalogue number 74-0876. The single reached number 15 on the US Billboard Hot 100 chart, becoming Bowie's first hit single in the country. In Canada, it reached number 16. RCA again reissued the song in the UK on 26 September 1975  as a maxi single, in which it was backed by "Changes" and the then-unreleased 1972 outtake "Velvet Goldmine"; its catalogue number is RCA 2593. The UK reissue was Bowie's first number-one single in the country, replacing "I Only Have Eyes for You" by Art Garfunkel at number one in November.

In December 1979, Bowie re-recorded "Space Oddity" for the ITV New Year special Will Kenny Everett Ever Make It to 1980? Show. The idea came from the show's director, David Mallet. Bowie recalled:

Visconti produced this new version; he stripped the original recording to acoustic guitar, bass, drums and piano. Doggett said this instrumentation mirrors John Lennon's 1970 album Plastic Ono Band, which had influenced Bowie's vocal performance on his 1977 album "Heroes". The new recording has a number of differences from the original; replacing the liftoff sequence is 12 seconds of silence and a snare drum fade-out ends the song. O'Leary said while the original "Space Oddity" ends "unresolved", the 1979 version leaves empty space. This version was issued in February 1980 as the B-side of Bowie's single "Alabama Song", which Visconti later said was "never meant" to occur. The 1979 recording was released in a remixed form in 1992 on the Rykodisc reissue of Scary Monsters (and Super Creeps), and in 2017 it was rereleased on Re:Call 3, part of the compilation A New Career in a New Town (1977–1982).

In July 2009, EMI issued the digital-only extended play (EP) "Space Oddity 40th Anniversary EP" to celebrate the 40th anniversary of the original single. The EP includes the original UK and US mono single edits, the 1979 re-recording and eight stem tracks that isolate the lead vocal, backing vocals, acoustic guitar, string, bass and drums, flute and cellos, Mellotron and Stylophone. These stem tracks are accompanied with a mobile app that allows users to create their own remixes. Pegg said the EP "provid[es] a fascinating insight into the component sounds of a classic recording". In 2015, the original UK mono single edit was included on Re:Call 1, as part of the box set Five Years (1969–1973).  The song's 50th anniversary was marked on 12 July 2019 by the release of digital and vinyl singles of a new remix of the song by Tony Visconti. The vinyl version was issued in a box set that also includes the original UK mono single edit.

Related releases
Several demo versions of "Space Oddity" have been commercially released. Two early demos, including a fragment that may be the first-recorded demo of the song, were released for the first time in April 2019 on the box set Spying Through a Keyhole. The January 1969 demo remained officially unreleased for more than 40 years until it appeared on the 2009 two-CD special edition of David Bowie, and was debuted on vinyl in May 2019 in the box set Clareville Grove Demos. An edited version of the April 1969 demo originally appeared as the opening track on the 1989 box set Sound + Vision. The unedited recording was released in June 2019 on the album The 'Mercury' Demos. All the abovementioned demos and another previously unreleased one were compiled for the 5-CD box set Conversation Piece, which was released in November 2019.  The February 1969 studio recording became commercially available in 1984 on a VHS release of the film Love You till Tuesday and its accompanying soundtrack album. A shorter edit appeared on the 1997 compilation album The Deram Anthology 1966–1968 and an alternative take was released for the first time on Conversation Piece.

Live versions
"Space Oddity" remained a concert staple and a live favourite throughout Bowie's career. On 22 May 1972, Bowie played the song for BBC Radio 1's  Johnny Walker Lunchtime Show but the recording was not broadcast. It was eventually released on the 1996 compilation BBC Sessions 1969–1972 (Sampler) and Bowie at the Beeb (2000). For the BBC session, Bowie inserted "I'm just a rocket man!" between verses; Elton John had recently released "Rocket Man", which is also about an astronaut and was also produced by Gus Dudgeon.

A version of the song that was recorded at Santa Monica Civic Auditorium on 20 October 1972 during the Ziggy Stardust Tour was first released on Santa Monica '72 before becoming officially available in 2008 on Live Santa Monica '72. A live performance that was recorded at the Hammersmith Odeon, London, on 3 July 1973 was released on Ziggy Stardust: The Motion Picture (1983). During the 1974 Diamond Dogs Tour, Bowie sang "Space Oddity" while being raised and lowered above the stage by a cherry picker crane and used a radio microphone that was disguised as a telephone. A July 1974 performance of the song was released on the 2005 reissue of David Live while a September performance from the same tour was released in 2017 on Cracked Actor (Live Los Angeles '74).

A concert performance that was recorded on 12 September 1983 was included on the live album Serious Moonlight (Live '83), which was included in the 2018 box set Loving the Alien (1983–1988) and released separately the following year. The same performance appears on the concert video Serious Moonlight (1984). Bowie effectively retired the song from live performances during his 1990 Sound+Vision Tour, after which he sang it on a few occasions, most notably closing his 50th birthday party concert in January 1997 with a solo performance on acoustic guitar; this version was released on a limited edition CD-ROM that was issued with Variety magazine in March 1999. He then performed it at the Tibet House US benefit concert at Carnegie Hall in February 2002; this new version includes an orchestra conducted by Visconti, with string arrangements played by Scorchio and Kronos Quartet. Bowie's final performance of "Space Oddity" was at Denmark's Horsens Festival during the 2002 Heathen Tour.

Music videos
On 6 February 1969, a clip of the first version of "Space Oddity" for Love You till Tuesday was filmed at Clarence Studios. Bowie plays both the tee-shirt-wearing Ground Control character and Major Tom; he wears a silver suit, a blue visor and breast plate. Final touches were made the following day. RCA used this clip to promote the September 1975 UK single reissue.

To promote RCA's December 1972 US reissue of "Space Oddity", a new promotional video was created at RCA's New York studios by photographer Mick Rock; Bowie, who was tired and wore little makeup, mimes to the song with a guitar. Bowie later said:
I really hadn't much clue why we were doing this, as I had moved on in my mind from the song, but I suppose the record company were re-releasing it again or something like that. Anyway, I know I was disinterested in the proceedings and it shows in my performance. Mick's video is good, though."

A promotional video for the 1979 version was debuted in the UK on 31 December 1979 on the Will Kenny Everett Ever Make It to 1980? Show, and in the US on Dick Clark's Salute to the Seventies. A fourth video, which was directed by Tim Pope and combines footage from Bowie's 50th birthday concert in Madison Square Garden with backdrop footage choreographer Édouard Lock filmed for the Sound+Vision Tour (1990), was created for the 2019 remix of the song to promote the box set Conversation Piece. The video was premiered at the Kennedy Space Center and in Times Square on 20 July, and uploaded to YouTube hours later.

Legacy

Major Tom
Bowie revisited the character Major Tom in the 1980 single "Ashes to Ashes", from Scary Monsters (and Super Creeps) (1980). In the song, Major Tom is described as a "junkie" who is "strung out in heaven's high, hitting an all time low" but Ground Control still believes Major Tom is doing as well as he was ten years prior. The song has been interpreted as Bowie's confrontation of his past; after years of drug addiction in the 1970s, he used those struggles as a metaphor for Major Tom becoming a drug addict. The song's music video reuses visual elements from the December 1979 television performance of "Space Oddity".

The 1996 Pet Shop Boys remix of the single "Hallo Spaceboy", from Outside (1995), also revisits Major Tom. The idea for the song came from Pet Shop Boys member Neil Tennant, who informed Bowie he would be adding "Space Oddity"-related lines to the remix. Although Bowie was hesitant at first, he accepted. Tennant sang the "Space Oddity"-related lines in the remix: "Ground to Major, bye-bye Tom / Dead the circuit, countdown's wrong".

Major Tom may have influenced the music video for Bowie's 2015 single "Blackstar", the title track from his final album Blackstar (2016). The video, a surreal, ten-minute short film that was directed by Johan Renck, depicts a woman with a tail (Elisa Lasowski), who discovers a dead astronaut and takes his jewel-encrusted skull to an ancient, otherworldly town. The astronaut's bones float towards a solar eclipse while in the town's centre, a circle of women perform a ritual with the skull. Renck initially refused to confirm or deny that the astronaut in the video is Major Tom but he later said on a BBC documentary: "to me, it was 100% Major Tom".

Retrospective appraisal
"Space Oddity" remains one of Bowie's most-popular songs and has frequently been listed by publications as one of his greatest songs. In 2015, Mojo magazine rated it Bowie's 23rd-best track in a list of his 100 greatest songs. Following Bowie's death in 2016, Rolling Stone named "Space Oddity" one of the 30 most-essential songs of Bowie's catalogue. A year later, the staff of Consequence of Sound voted it Bowie's tenth-best track. In 2017, the readers of NME voted "Space Oddity" Bowie's seventh-best track while the publication's staff placed it at number 18 in a list of Bowie's 40 best songs. 

The Guardian Alexis Petridis voted "Space Oddity" number 25 in his list of Bowie's 50 greatest songs, writing: "Bowie perfectly inhabits its mood of blank-eyed, space-age alienation". In 2020, Tom Eames of Smooth Radio listed "Space Oddity" as Bowie's fifth-greatest song. Both Ultimate Classic Rock and The Telegraph listed it as Bowie's greatest song in 2016 and 2021, respectively. Spencer Kaufman wrote: "The song was revolutionary for its time, musically and lyrically, and helped introduce the masses to one of the most dynamic and creative music acts we will ever know." In a list ranking every Bowie single from worst to best, Ultimate Classic Rock placed "Space Oddity" at number four.

"Space Oddity" has appeared on numerous best-of lists. In a 2000 list compiling the 100 greatest rock songs, VH1 placed "Space Oddity" at number 60. In 2012, Consequence of Sound included it in their list of the 100 greatest top songs of all time, ranking it number 43. In lists ranking the greatest songs of the 1960s, NME ranked "Space Oddity" at number 20, Pitchfork placed it at number 48, Paste magazine ranked it number three and Treble magazine placed it at number two. In 2021, Rolling Stone ranked "Space Oddity" at number 189 in their list of the "500 Greatest Songs of All Time". The magazine stated as Bowie's first hit, it "offer[ed] just a glimpse of the ever-evolving star he would become". Several publications, including Mojo (39), NME (67), and Sounds (41), have also listed "Space Oddity" as one of the greatest singles of all time. Channel 4 and The Guardian similarly ranked it the 27th-greatest British number-one single in 1997 while NME ranked it number 26 in their 2012 list of the greatest number-one singles in history.

The Rock and Roll Hall of Fame included "Space Oddity" in their list of "The 500 Songs That Shaped Rock and Roll". The song was inducted into the Grammy Hall of Fame in 2018.

Track listing
All songs written by David Bowie.

 1969 UK original
 "Space Oddity" – 4:33 (mono)
 "Wild Eyed Boy from Freecloud" – 3:52

 1969 US original
 "Space Oddity" – 3:26
 "Wild Eyed Boy from Freecloud" – 3:20

 1969 "Ragazzo solo, ragazza sola"
 "Ragazzo solo, ragazza sola" (Bowie, Mogol) – 5:15
 "Wild Eyed Boy from Freecloud" (Bowie) – 4:59

 1973 US Reissue
 "Space Oddity" – 5:05
 "The Man Who Sold the World" – 3:53

 1975 UK reissue
 "Space Oddity" – 5:15
 "Changes" – 3:33
 "Velvet Goldmine" – 3:14

 2009 EMI reissue (Digital EP)
 "Space Oddity" (Original UK mono single edit)
 "Space Oddity" (US mono single edit)
 "Space Oddity" (US stereo single edit)
 "Space Oddity" (1979 rerecording)
 "Space Oddity" (Bass and drums)
 "Space Oddity" (Strings)
 "Space Oddity" (Acoustic guitar)
 "Space Oddity" (Mellotron)
 "Space Oddity" (Backing vocal, flute and cellos)
 "Space Oddity" (Stylophone and guitar)
 "Space Oddity" (Lead vocal)
 "Space Oddity" (Main backing vocal including countdown)

 2019 reissue (2×7")
Disc 1
 "Space Oddity" (Original Mono Single Edit)
 "Wild Eyed Boy from Freecloud" (Original Mono Single Version)
Disc 2
 "Space Oddity" (2019 Mix – Single Edit)
 "Wild Eyed Boy from Freecloud" (2019 Mix – Single Version)

Personnel
Credits apply to the 1969 original release:

 David Bowie vocals, 12-string acoustic guitar, Stylophone, handclaps
 Mick Wayne lead guitar
 Herbie Flowers bass guitar
 Terry Cox drums
 Paul Buckmaster string arrangement
 Tony Visconti flutes, woodwinds
 Rick Wakeman Mellotron

Production
 Gus Dudgeon producer

Ragazzo solo, ragazza sola (1969)
 Producers: Gus Dudgeon
 Musicians:
 David Bowie – vocals, guitar, Stylophone
 Herbie Flowers – bass
 Terry Cox – drums
 Rick Wakeman – Mellotron
 String Section (unnamed)

Charts and certifications

Weekly charts

Year-end charts

Certifications

Cover versions and appearances in media
"Space Oddity" has been covered by numerous artists. Performers on the original recording Rick Wakeman and Terry Cox, specifically the latter's band Pentangle, have covered the song. One of Bowie's favourite versions was a recording by the Langley Schools Music Project, a 60-voice choir of Canadian children who were recorded in the late 1970s and reissued on CD in 2002. Bowie said: "The backing arrangement is astounding. Coupled with the earnest if lugubrious vocal performance, you have a piece of art that I couldn't have conceived of, even with half of Colombia's finest export products in me." Many artists have written songs that reference or develop the story of "Space Oddity"; these include German singer Peter Schilling's 1983 song "Major Tom (Coming Home)", Panic on the Titanic's "Major Tom", and Def Leppard's 1987 single "Rocket". English singer-songwriter Jonathan King released a mashup of "Space Oddity" together with Peter Schilling's "Major Tom (Coming Home)" titled "Space Oddity / Major Tom (Coming Home)". This release reached No. 77 on the UK Singles Chart in May 1984.

"Space Oddity" has been heard and referenced in numerous films and television series, including the American sitcom Friends, the British series EastEnders and Shooting Stars, and the films Mr. Deeds (2002), The Mother (2003) and C.R.A.Z.Y. (2005). The original single version is heard on the soundtrack of the 2004 film The Life and Death of Peter Sellers and a 2015 episode of the American drama series Mad Men. It was also featured in a 2011 Renault Clio commercial and played on the radio of Elon Musk's Tesla Roadster during its launch aboard the Falcon Heavy's maiden flight in February 2018.

The song plays a pivotal role in the 2013 film The Secret Life of Walter Mitty, in which Walter Mitty (Ben Stiller) is frequently referred to as "Major Tom" for daydreaming while at work. "Space Oddity" is featured in a scene in which Mitty decides to leap onto a helicopter after imagining his coworker Cheryl (Kristen Wiig) singing the song. For the scene, Wiig's vocal was mixed into Bowie's original track. Stiller said about the importance of "Space Oddity" in the scene:
I felt like the way it fits into the story, we got to this point and this scene which was sort of how the fantasy and reality come together for Walter, and that was what that came out of. That song, and what he mentioned in his head, and what he imagines and what he does, it all just seemed to come together over that song. 

"Space Oddity" was played throughout the entire opening montage for the 2017 film Valerian and the City of a Thousand Planets, which showed humans making contact with extraterrestrial life. Director Luc Besson timed the sequences of the scene to the guitar chords of "Space Oddity", and it took many hours for the shots from the film to be synched with the song, and the bass riff was used to signify humanity's first contact with aliens. The opening sequence had originally been storyboarded with the intention of 'Space Oddity' being played in the background, with Besson saying "It's almost a music video; I matched the song to the image." Besson previously worked with Bowie on Arthur and the Invisibles (2006), and the singer agreed to allow Besson to use "Space Oddity" in Valerian and the City of a Thousand Planets, although Bowie died before the film was released.

Chris Hadfield version

In May 2013, Canadian astronaut Chris Hadfield, commander of Expedition 35 to the International Space Station (ISS), recorded a video of "Space Oddity" on the ISS that went viral and generated a great deal of media exposure. It was the first music video to be recorded in space. In the video, which was filmed at the end of Hadfield's time at the ISS, Hadfield sang and played guitar while floating around the space station. On Earth, Joe Corcoran produced and mixed the backing track with a piano arrangement by multi-instrumentalist Emm Gryner, who worked with Bowie during his 1999–2000 concert tours. Gryner said she was "so proud to be a part of it". 

The lyrics were somewhat altered; rather than losing communication with Ground Control and being lost in space as a result, Major Tom receives his orders to land and does so safely, reflecting Hadfield's imminent return from his final mission to the ISS. Hadfield announced the video on his Twitter account, writing: "With deference to the genius of David Bowie, here's Space Oddity, recorded on Station. A last glimpse of the World." Bowie's social media team responded to the video, tweeting back to Hadfield, "Hallo Spaceboy ...", and later called the cover "possibly the most poignant version of the song ever created".

Hadfield's performance was the subject of a piece by Glenn Fleishman in The Economist on 22 May 2013 analyzing the legal implications of publicly performing a copyrighted work of music while in Earth orbit. The song is the only one of Bowie's for which he did not own the copyright. Bowie's publisher granted Hadfield a one-year licence to the song. On 13 May 2014, when the one-year licence expired, the official video was taken offline despite Bowie's explicit wishes for the publisher to grant Hadfield a licence at no charge to record the song and produce the video. Following negotiations, the video was restored to YouTube on 2 November 2014 with a two-year licence agreement in place. According to Pegg, Hadfield's video is "Breathtakingly beautiful and extraordinarily moving, [and] offers a rare opportunity to deploy that overused adjective 'awesome' with complete justification".

See also
 "Ashes to Ashes" (David Bowie song)
 "Hallo Spaceboy"
 "Blackstar" (song)

References

Sources

External links
 Love you till Tuesday version on YouTube
 Chris Hadfield's version on YouTube

1969 songs
1969 singles
1973 singles
1975 singles
David Bowie songs
Number-one singles in France
UK Singles Chart number-one singles
Songs about spaceflight
Songs about fictional male characters
Songs written by David Bowie
Song recordings produced by Gus Dudgeon
Philips Records singles
Mercury Records singles
RCA Records singles
Major Tom
Psychedelic folk songs
Folk ballads
1960s ballads